Chica Vampiro (Vampire Girl) is a Colombian teen telenovela produced by RCN Televisión. It is an original story written by Argentinian , whose work has included Amor en Custodia, Patito Feo, Braveheart, and Aurora, among others. It follows the adventures of the young vampire Daisy O'Brian, played by Greeicy Rendón. Throughout Latin America, the series is broadcast by Nickelodeon Latin America.
According to KidScreen Magazine, as of February 2014, Chica Vampiro was the most viewed program among children and teens between the ages of 4 and 17 in Colombia. In September 2019, RCN Televisión announced that Chica Vampiro would be available on Netflix.

Premise 
The series follows the life of Daisy O'Brian (Greeicy Rendón), an otherwise ordinary teenaged girl born into a family of vampires, who maintain a family tradition of offering the vampire curse to its members on their 16th birthday: Daisy, who had long made up her mind to remain mortal, is hit by a truck on that very day. When doctors inform her family that Daisy will die of her injuries, her parents Ana (Jacqueline Arenal) and Ulises (Juan Pablo Obregón) decide to bite her, turning her into a vampire and saving her life.

With vampirism thrust upon her against her will, Daisy is forced to hide her true nature from mortals and learn to live between two worlds: the mortal realm, where she attends school and attempts to pursue her dream of being a singer, and the Vampire World (Mundo Vampiro in the series), where she must attend vampire school, to learn how to deal with her new condition. Daisy must also deal with her feelings for her neighbor Max de la Torre (Santiago Talledo), for whom she intended to remain mortal, and with the feelings of vampire Mirco Vladimoff (Eduardo Pérez), who believes Daisy is his prophesied true love.

Throughout the series, the O'Brian family also faces conflict from other sources, such as mortals attempting to unmask them and feuds with other vampire families.

Characters 

Daisy O'Brian (Greeicy Rendón)
Santiago Talledo as Max De La Torre.
Mirco Vladimoff as (Eduardo Pérez)
Lorena García as Marilyn Garcés.
Lucía Barragan as (Estefany Escobar)
Ulises O'Brian as (Juan Pablo Obregón)
Jacqueline Arenal as Ana McLaren, Daisy & Vicente's mother
Norma Nivia as Catalina Vladimoff
Vanessa Blandón as Belinda De La Torre
David Prada as Alejandro Corchuelo
Erick Torres as Vicente O'Brian
Julieta Vladimoff as (Aura María Cardenas)
Chiara Francia as Esmeralda Vladimoff
Susana Posada as Zaira Fangoria
Linda Lucía Callejas as María McLaren
Rafael Taibo as Drácula BlackMerMoon.
Constanza Hernández as Noelia Pirrman
Bibiana Navas as Lynette De La Torre
Gustavo Ángel as Álvaro De La Torre
Germán Escallón as Francisco Agudelo
Pericles Gonzáles as (David Carrasco)
Ilenia Antonini as Wendy BlackMerMoon
Martha Silva as Leonor Gárces
Sebastian Boscán as Octavio
Juan Manuel Restrepo as Luis
Alfredo Cuellar as Bruno Vladimoff "VampiMan"
Guillermo Blanco as "Vampi Araña"

References

External links 
 Official Website
 RCN Official Site
 Official Website of Marcela Citterio
 Fansite

Colombian telenovelas
Spanish-language telenovelas
2013 telenovelas
Children's telenovelas
Teen telenovelas
RCN Televisión telenovelas
2013 Colombian television series debuts
2013 Colombian television series endings
Television shows set in Bogotá
Television series about teenagers